The Pemberton-Billing P.B.1, sometimes known as the Supermarine, was a 1910s British single-seat flying-boat built by Pemberton-Billing Limited, which later became the Supermarine Aviation Works. Only one P.B.1 was built, and it never flew any distance further than a hop.

Design and development
The P.B.1 was a single-seat open cockpit biplane powered by a 50 hp (36 kW) Gnome rotary engine driving a three-bladed pusher propeller, which was mounted in a tractor configuration nacelle between the upper wings and the fuselage. It had a single-step hull designed by the naval architect Linton Hope, with a spruce skin over a mahogany structure, and covered with waterproof fabric. It had two-bay wings constructed of spruce and Ash, with ailerons on the upper wing and floats under the lower wingtips. The pilot sat in a cockpit aft of the wing trailing edge.

Described as "a boat that will fly, [instead of] an aeroplane that will float", only one P.B.1 was built; the prototype was displayed at the Olympia Aero Show in March 1914. It was rebuilt during April 1914, with the pilot's cockpit moved forward to the nose of the aircraft, and the Gnome engine mounted on top of the fuselage, driving two 3-bladed pusher propellers via chain drives. Following the modifications, the P.B.1 entered testing, but failed to achieve flight during testing on Southampton Water on 30 May 1914. Noel Pemberton Billing, the head of Pemberton-Billing Limited and designer of the PB.1, claimed that the aircraft made a short hop during June, but other sources state that the PB.1 never flew.

Following the conclusion of the attempted flight testing, the P.B.1 was dismantled on 28 July 1914, with its engine being used in the Pemberton-Billing P.B.9 single seat scout aircraft.

Specifications (P.B.1)

See also

References

Notes

Citations

Bibliography

Supermarine aircraft
1910s British civil utility aircraft
Flying boats
Biplanes
Single-engined tractor aircraft
Aircraft first flown in 1914